Daniel Lawton (27 November 1881 – 27 March 1979) was a French tennis player. He competed in the men's doubles event at the 1920 Summer Olympics.

References

External links
 

1881 births
1979 deaths
French male tennis players
Olympic tennis players of France
Tennis players at the 1920 Summer Olympics
Sportspeople from Gironde